Like a Star Shining in the Night is a 2008 French drama film written, produced and directed by René Féret.

Cast 
 Salomé Stévenin as Anne  
 Nicolas Giraud as Marc   
 Jean-François Stévenin as Le père d'Anne 
 Marilyne Canto as Dr. Camille Bamberger 
 Aurélia Petit as Aurélie 
 Guillaume Verdier as Eric 
 Sabrina Seyvecou as Sabine   
 Yves Reynaud as Le père de Marc    
 Claire Stévenin as La mère d'Anne 
 Caroline Loeb as La mère de Marc  
 Julien Féret as Antoine 
 René Féret as Le chef de Marc et Eric

References

External links 
 

2008 films
2008 drama films
2000s French-language films
French drama films
Films about cancer
Films directed by René Féret
2000s French films